The brick seamoth, Pegasus laternarius, also known as the long-tailed dragonfish, long-tailed seamoth, pelagic dragon-fish, or the winged dragonfish, is a species of fish in the Pegasidae, or seamoth, family. This species is used extensively in the Guangdong and Guangxi province of China to treat scrofula, cough, and diarrhea.

Etymology
Their genus name, Pegasus is taken from the Greek mythological creature the Pegasus, or a winged horse of Perseus. Their species name, laternarius is derived from the Latin word later, meaning "made of bricks".

Description
They have a variety of colors but are mainly yellow to blue with a dark brown underside. Juveniles and females have a shorter rostrum than adult males.

Diet and behavior
They rarely live other than several places in Japan where they are found in sheltered muddy areas.

Distribution
It is found in China, Japan, Taiwan, and Thailand in the Indo-West Pacific ocean.

References

Laternarius
Fish described in 1816
Taxa named by Georges Cuvier
Taxonomy articles created by Polbot